Adrain is a name of Scottish and English origin, an altered form of Adrian, and may refer to:

 Garnett Adrain (1815–1878), American politician
 Robert Adrain (1775–1843), scientist and mathematician

See also 
 Adran (disambiguation)
 Audrain (disambiguation)
 Adrian (disambiguation)

References